Timberline is a name for several high schools in North America, including:

Timberline High School (Boise, Idaho)
Timberline High School (Weippe, Idaho)
Timberline High School (Lacey, Washington)

See also
Timberline Secondary School in Campbell River, British Columbia